Juha Tarkkanen (born July 10, 1993) is a Finnish ice hockey defenceman. He is currently playing with Anglet Hormadi Élite in the French Ligue Magnus.

Tarkkanen previously played in Liiga with HIFK, KalPa and Sport. On May 11, 2018, Tarkkanen moved to France and signed for Aigles de Nice of the Ligue Magnus. A year later on May 1, 2019, he joined fellow French side Anglet Hormadi Élite.

References

External links

1993 births
Living people
Anglet Hormadi Élite players
Espoo United players
Finnish ice hockey defencemen
HC Keski-Uusimaa players
HIFK (ice hockey) players
KalPa players
KeuPa HT players
Kiekko-Vantaa players
Lempäälän Kisa players
Les Aigles de Nice players
Ice hockey people from Helsinki
Vaasan Sport players